Highland Meadows is a census-designated place in Valencia County, New Mexico, United States. Its population was 624 as of the 2010 census.

Geography

Demographics

Education
It is in the Los Lunas Public Schools school district.

See also

 List of census-designated places in New Mexico

References

Census-designated places in New Mexico
Census-designated places in Valencia County, New Mexico